Nebria motschulskyi is a species of ground beetle in the Nebriinae subfamily that is endemic to Russia.

References

motschulskyi
Beetles described in 1846
Endemic fauna of Russia